Justin Bacik (born August 25, 1976), better known as Hefe Heetroc (stylized as HEFE HƏƏTROC) and formerly known as Wez Nilez, is an American rapper from New Mexico. His musical style has been described as a fusion of hip-hop, glitch-hop, and vaporwave, amongst other styles.

He grew up in Rochester, NY, moving to California and then Albuquerque, New Mexico. His musical pursuits began by studying guitar at age 19, and at age 27, he shifted his focus towards hip-hop. He has collaborated with fellow emcee Loose Logic, his music has been featured on numerous blogs such as Thisis50, and his single ‘Space Energy’ has been aired on WRIU FM by Dj Padrino (of the Coke Boys).

Discography

As Wez Nilez
 Inoculare Mixtape (2011)
 The Inoculation 2 (2012)
 The Inoculation 3 (2012)
 The Vault (2012) - guest feature, hosted by Loose Logic

As Hefe Heetroc
 Inoculare Intersecting Dimensions (2016)
 Blind Allegiance EP (2017)
 The Shadow Cabal of the 8 Oligarchs (2017)
 The Julie Project (2017)
 Misled Victory Mixtape (2018)
 Empire of the Forgotten (2018)
 Alienz & Conspiracies Boxset (2018)
 Swaggagascar (2019)
 Swaggagascar 2 (2020)

References

External links
 Hefe Heetroc at Bandcamp
 Radio spot: Do U Pt II on WRIU fm
 Space Energy single
 Official twitter
 Official youtube

1976 births
Living people
American rappers
Underground rappers
21st-century American rappers